Atlanta History Center is a history museum and research center located in the Buckhead district of Atlanta, Georgia. The Museum was founded in 1926 and currently consists of nine permanent, and several temporary, exhibitions. Atlanta History Center's campus is 33-acres and features historic gardens and houses located on the grounds, including Swan House, Smith Farm, and Wood Family Cabin. Atlanta History Center's Midtown Campus includes the Margaret Mitchell House & Museum. The History Center's research arm, Kenan Research Center, includes 3.5 million resources and a reproduction of historian Franklin Garrett's (1906–2000) office. Atlanta History Center holds one of the largest collections of Civil War artifacts in the United States.

Exhibitions
Atlanta History Center operates three types of exhibitions: permanent, temporary, and traveling.

Permanent exhibitions 
 Atlanta '96: Shaping an Olympic and Paralympic City is Atlanta History Center's latest permanent exhibit, expected to premiere in September 2020. This exhibit will focus on the impact of the Olympic Games on Atlanta and its citizens. It will examine what the games meant to different groups of people, from those involved in preparing for the event to those whose lives are still impacted by the games over 20 years later.
 Cyclorama: The Big Picture was opened in February 2019, and features the fully restored cyclorama painting, The Battle of Atlanta. At the centerpiece of this new multimedia experience is a 132-year-old hand-painted work of art that stands 49 feet tall. Two levels of exhibitions look at truths and myths of the Civil War; explore the untold stories of the painting; examine the role movies and visual entertainment have on shaping perspectives of the Civil War; and provides a look at the fleeting entertainment sensation of cycloramas.
 Locomotion: Railroads and the Making of Atlanta exhibition centers around the restored locomotive Texas, which was built in 1856 for the Western & Atlantic Railroad, which had established its terminus in 1837 at the site that became Atlanta. The other centerpiece in the Locomotion exhibition is the Zero Mile Post, one of the city's most significant artifacts. Recently relocated to Atlanta History Center, the Zero Mile Post is the 1850s Western & Atlantic Railroad marker around which Atlanta grew. The detailed exhibition accompanying the Texas and Zero Mile Post interprets the major role railroads played in transforming Atlanta into the transportation hub and commercial center it is today.
 Turning Point: The American Civil War exhibition contains 1,400 of Atlanta History Center's enormous collection of Civil War artifacts. Through original artifacts, including cannons, uniforms, swords, and other materials, visitors can better understand life during the Civil War.
 Gatheround: Stories of Atlanta is an interactive exhibition that explores the various influential people and places that makeup Atlanta, as well as themes such as “Politics and Policy; Cultural Life; Family and Community; and Urban Growth.” This exhibition shares the stories of individuals of many different backgrounds and perspectives who helped create the Atlanta we know today through artifacts, ephemera, interactive media, recording booths, immersive experiences, and dedicated spaces while setting the stage for Meet the Past museum theatre performances.
 Shaping Traditions: Folk Arts in a Changing South exhibit shows the development and attributes of Southern folk art. It includes forms ranging from clothing and food to singing and storytelling and presents both the traditional and the modern.
 Native Lands: Indians and Georgia shares the history and stories of the state's original inhabitants beginning with the Mississippian peoples and continuing with their descendants, the Creeks and the Cherokees. Long before the first European settlers came to what is now called Georgia, the Mississippian Indians developed complex societies on these lands – complete with art, music, ceremony, agriculture, architecture, and trade industries. Native Lands explores Indians’ recent history and their continuing connections to Georgia through the voices of contemporary Creeks and Cherokees.
 Fair Play: The Bobby Jones Story explores the life of Georgia's most famous golfer, Bobby Jones, and chronicles the early development of golf in the United States. For a career that launched six decades before the birth of Tiger Woods, Bobby Jones is credited with popularizing golf on an international stage. His 14-year playing career culminated in 1930 when he became the only golfer to achieve the Grand Slam by winning golf's four major tournaments in the same year.
 Mandarin Shutze: A Chinese Export Life exhibit tells the story of Philip Trammell Shutze, one of Atlanta's foremost architects, who was also known for his art collections. A Phillip Trammell Shutze designed house, the Swan House, is also on the grounds of Atlanta History Center.

Temporary exhibitions   
 Any Great Change: The Centennial of the 19th Amendment which was open until Jan 31, 2021, commemorates the centennial of the 19th Amendment to the U.S. Constitution (August 1920) and documents how women gained the vote and the ways they have used political power over the last century. The exhibition explores the decades-long struggle for women's suffrage as well as the key groups, their strategies, and their leaders, including Emily C. MacDougald and her daughter, Emily Inman, owner of Swan House.
 Black Citizenship in the Age of Jim Crow comes to Atlanta via the New York Historical Society and explores the African American struggle for full citizenship and racial equality that unfolded in the 50 years following the Civil War. The exhibition highlights the ways African Americans advocated for full inclusion in American democracy from 1865 through World War I. The exhibition features art, historical artifacts, photographs, and specially-created media pieces that illustrate transformative events in the past and their continuing relevance today.

Historic buildings

Main campus 
 Smith Farm is an antebellum farmhouse built by the Robert Smith family and listed on the National Register of Historic Places (NRHP). It was originally a small farm in DeKalb County with 11 enslaved peoples, comprising 200 acres (0.81 km2). The house was moved to Atlanta History Center's main campus in 1969, and it currently comprises the farmhouse, enslaved people's cabin, kitchen, blacksmith shop, smokehouse, double corncrib, barn, and several gardens. The farmhouses several heritage breeds including angora goats and Gulf Coast sheep.
 The Victorian and Lee playhouses are miniature houses. The Lee playhouse is located between McElreath Hall and Smith Farm. It was donated to Atlanta History Center in 1998. The Victorian Playhouse is located beside the Boxwood Garden. It was donated to Atlanta History Center in 1980 and has gone through six owners.  
 Swan House, also on the NRNP, was designed by Philip Trammell Shutze in the 1920s, and is named for the swan motif located above the home's rear entrance. It is surrounded by the Boxwood Garden, based on Italian gardens as created in the 18th century England by Lord Burlington and William Kent. The front landscape, two cloverleaf fountains and a terraced lawn, comprise one of the most photographed places in Atlanta.
 Wood Family Cabin is a log structure located within Swan Woods. It is used to interpret North Georgia settler and Native American life in the 1820s and 1830s, in the context of the Georgia land lotteries. Some of its logs were originally used for the home of Elias and Jane Wood, early settlers in the Piedmont region of Georgia (where today's Buckhead district in Atlanta is located). The original home was situated approximately two miles from the site of the Creek Indian settlement of Standing Peachtree and one mile south of the Chattahoochee River. The cabin was donated to Atlanta History Center by Dr. and Mrs. Carl Hartrampf Jr., descendants of the Wood family, in 2014.

Gouzeta Gardens 
 Olguita's Garden is named after Goizueta Gardens namesake Olga “Olguita” C. de Goizueta. This ornamental garden is designed for the enjoyment of flowering and fragrant plants and is inspired by the great gardens of Europe, honoring Mrs. Goizueta's love of English and French gardens. The small formal garden provides seating with a view to a water feature surrounded by limestone columns designed by Atlanta architect Neel Reid. The garden's design and planting scheme reflect European influences on the Southeastern landscape and includes the entire garden façade of the Museum Building.
 Mary Howard Gilbert Memorial Quarry Garden was once a granite quarry, and has been transformed into a garden behind the main building. This native garden contains herbal medicinal plants, waterfalls, and what is Georgia's largest native plant collection in one place. Long-forgotten, the quarry was rediscovered in 1972 when the Atlanta History Center completed a survey of the property. It totals 25 feet deep and 3 acres in size. In the fifty years the quarry was abandoned, native trees sprang from the ground, and quick-growing shrubs and vines created a thick growth. Today, it is a sanctuary for native plants and the wildlife that depends on them. The Mary Howard Gilbert Memorial Quarry Garden shelters one of the state's most comprehensive collections of plants native to pre-settlement Georgia, many of which are rare and/or endangered.
 Smith Family Farm Gardens boasts a variety of heirloom plants, flowers, and heritage breeds at Smith Farm. The landscape represents Smith Farm in its early era, with historic varieties of crops in the fields, the enslaved people's garden, the kitchen garden, and a swept yard by the house planted with heirloom flowers such as love-lies-bleeding (Amaranthus sp.) and rose campion (Lychnis coronaria). Surrounding the farm's outbuildings are naturalistic, native plantings. Heritage-breed sheep, goats, chickens, and turkeys are representative of the types of livestock found on this type of farm.
 Swan House Gardens are part of the Inman estate which was designed by Shutze from 1926 to 1928. At Swan House, as with many of his grand homes, Shutze designed the formal gardens that surround and showcase the Inman residence.
 Frank A. Smith Memorial Rhododendron Garden's contemporary design is rich with shade-loving plants that flourish in Atlanta, from giant elephant ears (Colocasia esculenta) to dainty peacock moss (Selaginella uncinata). An intimate pond and a dry streambed are bordered by an abundance of rhododendrons (Rhododendron spp. & cvs.), small flowering trees, and eclectic ground covers.
 Sims Asian Garden provides a home to the Goizueta Gardens Asian Plant Collection. Benjamin H. Sims and his wife, Rebecca Wight Cherry Sims, were collectors of unusual and extraordinary Asian plants. Three major collection groups are on display in this garden: Satsuki azaleas, numerous varieties of hydrangea, and Japanese maples. Many of the Japanese maples in this garden are transplanted here directly from the Sims family's personal Japanese Garden.
 Swan Woods and Wood Family Cabin encompasses acres of robust forest surrounding the cabin. Vestiges of terraced cotton fields abandoned a century ago are still visible and sightings of wildlife reward the watchful. Lying among the pine, beech and tulip trees is a Fern Circle which produces a collection of species of ferns and wildflowers native to the Georgia Piedmont. Also situated on the Swan Woods Trail is the Garden for Peace, part of an international gardens network dedicated to promoting peace.
 Veterans Park

Midtown campus 
 Located at the corner of 10th and Peachtree Streets, Atlanta History Center's Midtown campus comprises the Margaret Mitchell House and Commercial Row, both of which are listed in the National Register of Historic Places. The Margaret Mitchell House was the home of Margaret Mitchell from 1925 to 1932 while she was writing the novel Gone With The Wind.

History

Atlanta History Center was founded in 1926 as the Atlanta Historical Society (AHS). Initially, the society operated as an institution for historical discussion and appreciation but, by the next year, began publishing the Atlanta Historical Bulletin. The periodical was later named Atlanta History: A Journal of Georgia and the South and was published until 2006. The publication has since been digitized and is searchable on Atlanta History Center's online database, Album.

Walter McElreath an Atlanta lawyer, legislator, and author for whom the center's McElreath Hall is named was the first leader of the Atlanta History Center. Other founders and early officers included Ruth Blair and Franklin Garrett. In the early days the organization rented a ground floor space in the Atlanta Biltmore Hotel, and later a space in the Erlanger Theater building on Peachtree.

In 1946 the group bought the Neel Reid designed Willis B. Jones home at the corner of Peachtree Street and Huntington Road as its headquarters. The Georgian mansion at 1753 Peachtree allowed the group to store and display its large collection of artifacts and photos.

Lack of parking and maintenance issues on the Jones home sparked another search for a new headquarters. In 1966 the group used money from Walter McElreath's estate to purchase the 23-acre Swan House property on Andrews Drive. This property became the current main campus of the History Center. (After it was sold by the Society, the Jones home was rescued from demolition by others and coincidentally moved to 520 West Paces Ferry Road about one mile west of the current location of the center)

In 1986 the still relatively small group received the DuBose Collection of Civil War artifacts, donated by Mrs. Beverly M. DuBose Jr. In 1989, the Atlanta Historical Society built the current museum to house the DuBose collection.

In 1990, the Atlanta Historical Society was renamed Atlanta History Center. The $15 million museum opened in 1993 with five exhibitions, including its first signature Atlanta history exhibition, Metropolitan Frontiers. An $11 million expansion, finished in 1996, added two new permanent exhibitions. The Kenan Research Center library was later expanded and the gardens reorganized, with a fourth permanent exhibition added, Down the Fairway with Bobby Jones.

In 2014, the city of Atlanta announced its intentions to relocate the Battle of Atlanta Cyclorama and its artifacts to Atlanta History Center, including the antebellum Western & Atlantic locomotive, the Texas. The museum constructed an expansion to house the 360-degree panoramic painting, as well as the Texas locomotive, and other pieces in the Cyclorama collection.

After a careful restoration, the Battle of Atlanta Cyclorama opened to the public February 22, 2019.

References

External links 

 Atlanta History Center website
 Atlanta History Center on Google Cultural Institute
 Atlanta, Georgia, a National Park Service Discover Our Shared Heritage Travel Itinerary

American Civil War museums in Georgia (U.S. state)
Biographical museums in Georgia (U.S. state)
Historic house museums in Georgia (U.S. state)
History centers
History museums in Georgia (U.S. state)
Historical society museums in Georgia (U.S. state)
Houses in Atlanta
Institutions accredited by the American Alliance of Museums
Museums in Atlanta
Museums established in 1926
1926 establishments in Georgia (U.S. state)